Erica Fawn Gimpel (born June 25, 1964) is an American actress, singer, and dancer. She is best known for her roles on television shows Fame as Coco Hernandez and on Profiler as Angel Brown. She is also known for her recurring roles on the television shows ER as Adele Newman and on Veronica Mars as Alicia Fennel.  From 2018 to 2020, Gimpel had a recurring role as Trisha on the series God Friended Me.

Gimpel was a judge on RTÉ One's Fame: The Musical, an Irish TV talent show seeking a boy and a girl to play Nick and Serena respectively in the Irish touring production of Fame.

In January 2010, Gimpel released her first CD, Spread your Wings and Fly.

Personal life
Gimpel was born in Manhattan, New York in 1964. She graduated from New York's High School of Performing Arts, a few months after she started filming her role as a student at the same school for the television show Fame. She had toured the United States and Europe with her mother, singer Phyllis Bash, in the play Porgy and Bess. Her father is Joseph Gimpel, a short story writer.

Filmography

Film

Television

See also 
 The Kids from "Fame"

References

External links
 
 

1964 births
Living people
Actresses from New York City
American expatriates in Ireland
Hispanic and Latino American actresses
People from Manhattan
20th-century American actresses
21st-century American actresses
African-American actresses
American television actresses
American film actresses
American stage actresses
Fiorello H. LaGuardia High School alumni
20th-century African-American women
20th-century African-American people
21st-century African-American women
21st-century African-American people